Kalaktang Monpa is an underdocumented Sino-Tibetan language spoken in West Kameng district, Arunachal Pradesh, India.

Classification
Kalaktang Monpa should not be confused with the Takpa language known under the name Tawang Monpa in India. It is also distinct from the neighboring Dirang Monpa language. According to Roger Blench, Tshangla as spoken in Bhutan is the closest external relative of Kalaktang Monpa. Glottolog classifies Kalaktang Monpa under Tshanglic, a sub-branch of the Bodic languages.

References

Languages of Arunachal Pradesh
West Kameng district
Endangered languages of India 
Bodic languages